Mounzer Khatib (born 4 April 1936) is a Syrian former sports shooter. He competed in the trap event at the 1972 Summer Olympics.

References

1936 births
Living people
Syrian male sport shooters
Olympic shooters of Syria
Shooters at the 1972 Summer Olympics
Place of birth missing (living people)